James May: Oh Cook! is a cooking programme hosted by James May and released via Amazon Prime Video in 2020. The programme features May attempting to cook a variety of different dishes, with each episode focussing on a particular cuisine or meal. The show's title is a play on James's catchphrase from previous programmes.

From 2019, May was involved in producing food-oriented videos for DriveTribe spin-off FoodTribe. In June 2020, it became apparent that May was working on a cookery show with Amazon. Amazon confirmed the show in July 2020, announcing that it would be released alongside a book, titled Oh Cook!: 60 Easy Recipes That Any Idiot Can Make.

In press interviews released alongside the first series, May stated that he would like to film a second series of the programme abroad, saying he would be interested in learning how to cook a "proper American breakfast".

Episodes
During the episodes May is assisted at times by home economist Nikki Morgan, who is kept in a cupboard until her assistance is required.

Release

Critical reception 
The programme has a score of 100% on review aggregator Rotten Tomatoes and a 4.7 out of 5 on Amazon Prime Video.

Michael Hogan for The Telegraph gave the series three out of five stars, saying the show has "unlikely charm" and there was "finally a cookery show for blokes". Lucy Mangan for The Guardian gave the series three out of five stars, saying it was "occasionally charming – and mostly slightly dismal".

References

External links
 

2020 British television series debuts
2020s British cooking television series
2020s British documentary television series
English-language television shows
Amazon Prime Video original programming
Oh Cook